Reda Helal (Arabic: رضا هلال) is an Egyptian journalist. He was deputy editor of Al-Ahram newspaper until 11 August 2003 when he disappeared in a presumed kidnapping. He was also a political activist, and a founding member of the Cairo Peace Society (CPS), a Copenhagen criteria support group.

Disappearance
Helal disappeared en route from Al-Ahram's offices to his home in Kasr El Aini hospital street in downtown Cairo. A factor which makes his disappearance all the more puzzling is that this is one of the most secure streets in the Egyptian capital as it contains the headquarters of the Arab League, the Egyptian Foreign Ministry, the American Embassy and the Egyptian Museum.

On the day of his disappearance Helal's family presented a complaint about it to Sayyeda Zeinab police station. Human rights groups and activists, as well as a number of journalists, have pressured the Egyptian government over the incident.

Current development
In a response from the Interior Ministry to Talaat Sadat, The Ministry of Interior affirmed that no truth yet on the missing journalist case.

See also
List of people who disappeared

References

External links
 Website created for search of Reda Helal
 The Egyptian Organization for Human Rights (EOHR) (20/6/2005) report "Egyptian journalists .. Fettered pens, continued prosecution and sexual assault"
 U.S. Department of State Country Report on Human Rights Practices 2005 - Egypt - March 2006
 Example of his views on Arab regimes and the need for 'Regime change'

2000s missing person cases
Disappeared journalists
Egyptian journalists
Enforced disappearances in Egypt
Missing people
Missing person cases in Egypt
Year of birth missing